Tebario is a corregimiento in Mariato District, Veraguas Province, Panama with a population of 599 as of 2010. Its population as of 1990 was 615; its population as of 2000 was 959.

References

Corregimientos of Veraguas Province